The US State of North Dakota experienced significant flooding in its major river basins in 2009, following abnormally heavy winter snows atop saturated and frozen ground.

Background

Ground which was already saturated when it froze at the onset of winter, melting snow which could not be absorbed by the frozen ground, and additional precipitation from a rain storm on March 22 and a later snowstorm, are reasons for the serious flooding.  Heavy snowfalls fell in the state toward the end of March, adding to the existing snowpack.

Flooding
Beulah and Hazen were affected by the Knife River and Spring Creek floods. Linton was affected by Big Beaver Creek floods. Barlow, Carrington, Napoleon was affected by overland flooding from heavy snowmelt. Mott was affected by the Cannonball River floods. Wells County, Foster County, and Stutsman County was affected by Pipestem river. Eddy County, Foster County, Stutsman County, La Moure County, and Dickey County was affected by James River.

Ice jams
Explosives had to be used blow up an ice jam on the Missouri River North Bismarck, North Dakota in Double Ditch. It was successful. Flooding would cause problems south of the Bismarck Expressway and west of Washington Street.

Souris River

Red River

The 2009 Red River flood along the Red River of the North in North Dakota and Minnesota in the United States and Manitoba in Canada brought record flood levels to the Fargo-Moorhead area. The flood is a result of saturated and frozen ground, Spring snowmelt exacerbated by additional rain and snow storms, and virtually flat terrain. Communities along the Red River prepared for more than a week as the U.S. National Weather Service continuously updated the predictions for the city of Fargo, North Dakota with an increasingly higher projected river crest. March 28, and started a slow decline. The river continued to rise to the north as the crest moved downstream.

Predictions and preparations

Wahpeton
Early predictions for the Wahpeton area saw a predicted level of at least . By March 24, the National Weather Service predicted the crest in Wahpeton and Breckenridge not to top , below the cities' levees.

Fargo area

As preparations began for the flooding on March 16, North Dakota Governor John Hoeven declared a statewide disaster in anticipation of flooding across the state. The city began filling sandbags on March 20.

Volunteers continued preparing sandbags, with 560,000 bags filled by late March 22 out of an expected 1.5 million to 2 million needed. By March 24, residents in Fargo-Moorhead had filled over 1 million sandbags and were attempting to fill a total of 2 million by the 26th. A levee in Georgetown, Minnesota was raised another two feet, and emergency dikes were being built in Fargo, Moorhead, Harwood, Grafton and Richland County.

In addition to the sandbags the construction of the dikes protecting the city has required large amounts of clay.  Clay has been brought from several places in and around the city, including the soccer field at Centennial Elementary School and around Discovery Middle School.

Grand Forks

At 2:30 A.M. CDT, the  National Weather Service offices in Grand Forks issued a Flash Flood Warning for extreme east-central Cass County due to a levee breach in Fargo on Linden Avenue. With the river now more than 6 meters (20 feet) above flood stage, there appears to be a growing sense in Fargo that despite best efforts, it may not be possible to build dikes high enough to hold back the river.

See also 
Red River Flood (disambiguation)

Notes

External links

National Weather Service – River Gauges for the Red River Valley
USGS Real-Time Water Data for Red River of the North at Fargo ND, including gage height and discharge rate
Boston.com Big Picture series
A wiki which has been set up to facilitate information exchange during the flood
FEMA North Dakota Flooding Response Page

North Dakota
Floods in Canada
Floods in the United States
North Dakota